John Joseph Hassett (died 24 November 1955) was an Irish politician. A farmer, he was first elected to Dáil Éireann as a Cumann na nGaedheal Teachta Dála (TD) for the Tipperary constituency at the June 1927 general election. He was re-elected at the September 1927 and 1932 general elections. He did not contest the 1933 general election.

References

Year of birth missing
1955 deaths
Cumann na nGaedheal TDs
Members of the 5th Dáil
Members of the 6th Dáil
Members of the 7th Dáil
Politicians from County Tipperary
Irish farmers